The 2 mile (10,560 feet or 3,218.688 metres) is a historic running distance.  Like the mile run, it is still contested at some invitational meets due its historical chronology in the United States and United Kingdom.  It has been largely superseded by the 3000 m (approximately 1.864 miles) and  5000 m, and by the 3200 m in NFHS American high school competitions.  The IAAF no longer keeps official world records for this distance; they are called world best instead.

The world best for men is 7:58.61 set by Kenyan Daniel Komen in Hechtel, Belgium on 19 July 1997. The women's record is 8:58.58, set by Ethiopian Meseret Defar in Brussels, Belgium on 14 September 2007. Komen is the only person to run the distance in under 8 minutes, and thus run two miles at a four-minute mile pace.

All-time top 25
i = indoor performance
mx = mixed race

Men
Correct as of August 2021.

Notes
Below is a list of other times equal or superior to 8:07.46:
Daniel Komen also ran 7:58.91 (1998), 8:03.54 (1996).
Haile Gebrselassie also ran 8:01.72 (1999), 8:01.86 (1999), 8:07.46 (1995).

Women
Correct as of August 2021.

Notes
Below is a list of other times equal or superior to 9:13.27:

Francine Niyonsaba also ran 9:00.75 (2021).
Meseret Defar also ran 9:06.26i (2009), 9:10.47 (2007), 9:10.50i (2008).
Mercy Cherono also ran 9:13.27 (2014).

World Record Progression

Men

Outdoors

Indoors

Women

Outdoors

Indoors

High school boys progression
Note:  this list only covers boys because the history of 2 mile running largely occurred before Title IX, before high school girls were allowed to compete, which occurred about the same time as conversion to metric distances.

See also
 Long-distance track event
 World records in athletics

Notes

External links

World Record progression in men's running events
World Records Set in Britain
World Records and Best Performances
Track and Field all-time Performances Homepage – Men's 2 miles
Track and Field all-time Performances Homepage – Women's 2 miles

Events in track and field
Middle-distance running